VADM or Vadm may refer to:
 Virtual axial dipole moment, see Dipole#Field of a static magnetic dipole
 Vice admiral